Castilla–La Mancha Televisión 2 (CMT2) was a Spanish television channel, launched in 2009. It was founded and started to broadcast in 2009. CMT 2 currently broadcasts in Spanish. It closed in 2011.

References

External links
www.rtvcm.es

Television stations in Spain
Television channels and stations established in 2009
Television channels and stations disestablished in 2011
Television in Castilla–La Mancha